Michael Carey (born 30 March 1999) is an Irish hurler who plays for Kilkenny intermediate Championship club Young Irelands and at inter-county level with the Kilkenny senior hurling team. He usually lines out as a left corner-back.

Playing career

Young Irelands

Carey joined the Young Irelands club at a young age and played in all grades at juvenile and underage levels before joining the club's top adult team.

Kilkenny

Minor and under-21

Carey first lined out for Kilkenny as a member of the minor team during the 2017 Leinster Championship. He made his first appearance for the team on 8 April 2017 when he lined out at full-back in Kilkenny's 3–22 to 0–04 defeat of Westmeath. Carey won a Leinster Championship medal on 2 July following a 3–15 to 1–17 defeat of Dublin in the final.

Carey progressed onto the Kilkenny under-21 team for the 2018 Leinster Championship. He made his first appearance for the team on 20 June 2018 when he was introduced as a half-time substitute for Ryan Bergin in a 3–13 to 1–17 defeat by Galway.

Senior

Carey joined the Kilkenny senior team prior to the start of the 2019 National League. He made his first appearance for the team on 17 February when he came on as a half-time substitute for Enda Morrissey in a 2–18 to 0–15 defeat by Limerick.

Personal life

Carey's father, D. J. Carey, is a five-time All-Ireland medal winner with Kilkenny.

Career statistics

Honours

St. Kieran's College
Leinster Colleges Senior Hurling Championship (1): 2017

Kilkenny
Leinster Minor Hurling Championship (1): 2017

References

1999 births
Living people
Young Irelands (Kilkenny) hurlers
Kilkenny inter-county hurlers